The Medical Council of the Islamic Republic of Iran (IRIMC) is the licensing and regulatory Body for Iranian healthcare professionals. Representing more than 286,000 registered members, IRIMC is responsible for licensing, authorization, and registration of healthcare professionals. The Iranian Medical Council is the recognized trade union for all of its registered members. IRIMC is the umbrella organization which regulates bi or multilateral collaborations between Iranian healthcare professionals and other organizations. With 200 regional branches nationwide, IRIMC officials are elected by the direct vote of Iranian healthcare professionals.

As the main national regulatory body for healthcare professionals, IRIMC oversees doctors and other licensed health workers to ensure that they fulfil their legal duty to maintain professional competence. This regulatory organization has the power to issue a warning to doctors as well as certain allied health workers, suspend and even revoke their license to practice.

History
In 1964, the Medical Council was first legislated by the Iranian Parliament which has been amended eight times in the following years. The last amendment was in 2004 when IRIMC legislation was approved by the country's Guardian Council of the Constitution.

Dr. Manouchehr Eghbal was the first elected president of this organization who was succeeded by Dr. Yahya Adl and Dr. Maleki, respectively.
Dr Abbas Sheibani (1981–1984) was the first IRIMC president after 1979 Islamic Revolution and was succeeded by Dr Mohammad Ali Hafizi (1984–1986), Dr Hadi Manafi (1986–1991), Dr Iradj Fazel (1991–1996), and Dr Sadr (1996–2001) respectively.
Dr Zafarghandi was the 6th term president (2001–2005) who was succeeded by Dr Sadr (2005–2013), Dr. Zali (2013–2017), Dr Iradj Fazel (2017–2019), and Dr. Mohammadreza Zafarghandi (2019-2021). 

On 1 October 2021, Dr Mohammad Raeiszadeh has been elected with 150 votes as the President of Iranian Medical Council in the new term.

IRIMC main bodies are as follows:

The General Assembly
The Supreme Council
The President
The Board of Directors of Medical Council Branches
The Disciplinary Committees who examine the guild and professional violations of healthcare professionals and affiliated occupations
Inspectors
Welfare and Cooperation Fund 

The Council helps improve the competency of health professionals through Continuing Medical Education (CME) programs and lifelong learning. Since 1996 CME has been mandatory for all health professionals. Administered by the Ministry of Health and Medical Education and the Medical Council of Iran, CME programs are routinely running in all IRIMC branches across the country.
Recently IRIMC promotes the development of Medical Tourism through projects planned by Health Tourism Strategic Council comprising representatives of the Medical Council of Iran, Ministry of Foreign Affairs, Ministry of Health and Medical Education and the Ministry of Cultural Heritage, Handicrafts and Tourism.

References

External links
 English Website

1964 establishments in Iran
Government agencies of Iran
Medical and health regulators
Medical and health organisations based in Iran
Medicine in Iran